Janet Barlow may refer to:

 Janet Barlow (scientist), professor of environmental physics
 Janet Barlow (Coronation Street), fictional character on Coronation Street